Chief executive is an alternate form for chief executive officer, the highest-ranking corporate officers (executives) or administrators.

Chief executive may also refer to:
 Chief Executive (magazine)

 Chief executive (gubernatorial), head of sub-national administrative region
 Specific jurisdictions:
 Chief Executive of Hong Kong, head of the Government of Hong Kong
 Chief Executive of Macau, head of government of Macau
 Chief Executive Officer (Afghanistan), head of government of Afghanistan

See also 
 Heads of sovereign bodies:
Head of government
 Head of state
Executive (government)